The Art of Doing Science and Engineering is a book by American mathematician Richard Hamming. The book comes from a course Hamming taught at the Naval Postgraduate School in Monterey, California. The book was originally published in 1997 by Gordon & Breach. It was republished in 2020 by Stripe Press.

References

1997 non-fiction books